Byeongjeom Station is a station on Line 1 of the Seoul Metropolitan Subway. It is the only train station serving the city of Hwaseong. It is the southern terminal station for approximately half of the subway trains on this line who then carry on to the nearby depot, one of the five depots on Line 1, with the remainder continuing to Cheonan or Sinchang Station.

Many centers of higher education, including Hanshin University, Suwon Science College and the University of Suwon, are located nearby, and shuttle buses run regularly between there and the campuses. In addition, Yungneung (융릉, 隆陵) and Geonneung (건릉, 健陵) – the royal tombs of Crown Prince Sado and his son King Jeongjo, the 22nd ruler of the Joseon Dynasty – lie to the west of the station.

References

Seoul Metropolitan Subway stations
Metro stations in Hwaseong, Gyeonggi
Railway stations in Korea opened in 1905